Live Parc des Princes Paris (2008) is Mika's second live DVD. It is a one-off stadium show with a crowd of 55,000 recorded at Paris on 4 July 2008.  
The DVD also features a documentary following the initial idea of the show through to the production.
In Bonus Features it includes the music video for the song "Lollipop", a live performance of "Grace Kelly" and the making-of the design and others in the show.

Track listing

Release and DVD information 
The DVD was released on 10 November 2008 in the UK and Europe and 16 December 2008 in the US. . The DVD was available for pre-order since 21 October in several online stores.   The official release date was confirmed on Mika's online blog; There he gave the cover and the video preview that can be seen on YouTube. 
It has been released on DVD in a standard case with a small booklet of art and photos and on Deluxe DVD with a hard cover and larger booklet of photos and artwork. It has also been released on Blu-ray, not like Mika's first video album which was only released in DVD.

The DVD was set to have two live presentations from the V Festival, but after the DVD was officially released no performances from the V Festival were included. The DVD also has subtitles of the concert in several languages including Spanish, Portuguese, Japanese and German.

References

External links 
 

Mika (singer) video albums
2008 albums
Concert films
Warner Records live albums
Warner Records video albums
Island Records live albums
Island Records video albums
Universal Records live albums
Universal Records video albums
Festival Records live albums
Festival Records video albums
Live video albums
2008 live albums
2008 video albums